Cremnophila is a genus of flowering plants belonging to the family Crassulaceae.

Its native range is Central Mexico.

Species
Species:

Cremnophila linguifolia 
Cremnophila nutans 
Cremnophila tlahuicana

References

Crassulaceae
Crassulaceae genera